John Joseph Snyder (October 25, 1925 – September 27, 2019) was an American prelate of the Catholic Church,  He served as the eighth bishop of the Diocese of St. Augustine in Florida from 1979 to 2000.  He previously served as an auxiliary bishop of the Diocese of Brooklyn in New York from 1972 to 1979

Biography

Early life 
John Snyder was born in New York City on October 25, 1925, to John Joseph and Katherine Walsh Snyder. He attended St. Bartholomew and St. Andrew Avellino schools before studying for the priesthood at Cathedral College in Brooklyn and Immaculate Conception Seminary in Huntington, New York. 

Snyder was ordained to the priesthood for the Diocese of Brooklyn on June 9, 1951, by Bishop Thomas Molloy. After serving for six years at St. Mel Parish in Flushing, New York, Snyder was appointed assistant secretary (1957–1968) to Bishop Bryan J. McEntegart and then secretary (1968–1972) to Bishop Francis J. Mugavero.

Auxiliary Bishop of Brooklyn 
On December 13, 1972, Pope Paul VI appointed Snyder as an auxiliary bishop of the Diocese of Brooklyn. He was consecrated on February 2, 1973 at the Church of Our Lady of Perpetual Help in Brooklyn. Mugavero served as principal consecrator, with bishops John Boardman and Paul Hagarty serving as principal co-consecrators.

Bishop of St. Augustine 
In October 1979, Pope John Paul II appointed Snyder as bishop of the Diocese of Saint Augustine, where he was installed on December 5, 1979. His episcopal motto was "Peace in Christ".

Retirement and legacy 
As required by canon law, Snyder submitted his resignation on his 75th birthday on October 25, 2000. Pope John Paul II accepted Snyder's resignation on December 12, 2000. Snyder was elected diocesan administrator on December 15, 2000, by the diocesan college of consultors and served as administrator until August 21, 2001, when Monsignor Victor Galeone was consecrated bishop. Bishop John J. Snyder High School in Jacksonville, Florida, is named after him. Snyder celebrated an annual Mass at the school. He also went to most of the home sports games. 

John Snyder died in Jacksonville on September 27, 2019 at age 93.

Episcopal succession

See also
 

 Catholic Church hierarchy
 Catholic Church in the United States
 Historical list of the Catholic bishops of the United States
 List of Catholic bishops of the United States
 Lists of patriarchs, archbishops, and bishops

References

External links
Official biography including photos, pastoral statements and homilies
Diocese of St. Augustine, Florida
The St. Augustine Catholic, Diocesan Magazine

1925 births
2019 deaths
Roman Catholic bishops of Saint Augustine
20th-century Roman Catholic bishops in the United States